Stop Climate Chaos Scotland 

(SCCS) is a coalition of organisations in Scotland that are campaigning on climate change, including trade and student unions, environmental and international development organisations, faith and community groups.  The coalition has close links with the Stop Climate Chaos coalition in London although it is a separately constituted organisation.

Background 
The organisation has a small staff team, and is overseen by an elected Board. The current chair is Tom Ballantine, a former lawyer. The previous chair was Mike Robinson, now Chief Executive of the Royal Scottish Geographical Society.

Stop Climate Chaos Scotland played a key role in the development of the Climate Change (Scotland) Act 2009, the strongest climate change legislation in the world. Stop Climate Chaos Scotland now works to ensure that the commitments set out in the Scottish Climate Change Act become a reality and that Scotland meets its targets to reduce emissions by 42% by 2020 and 80% by 2050.  As Scotland’s own emissions account for only a relatively small percentage of the global total, SCCS is also working with civil society groups in other countries to promote the Scottish climate change example.

Member organisations include
 ACTSA Scotland
 Airportwatch Scotland
 A Rocha Scotland
 Association for the Conservation of Energy
Baldernock Community Council
 Changeworks
Christian Aid in Scotland
Church of Scotland
Concern Worldwide
 Cycling and Touring Club Scotland
Edinburgh University Students' Association
 Energy Agency
 Fife Diet
Friends of the Earth Scotland
Glasgow University Students' Representative Council
Greenpeace
 Guildtown & Wolfhill Carbon Community Action Project
Heriot-Watt University Students' Association
Humanist Society Scotland
 Iona Community
Justice and Peace Scotland
 Napier University Students' Association
 National Union of Students Scotland
Oxfam in Scotland
People and Planet
RSPB Scotland
 SCIAF
 Scottish Episcopal Church
 Scottish Seabird Centre
 SCVO
 SEAD
Spokes
Sustrans
Tearfund
Transform Scotland
 Transition Linlithgow
 UKYCC
UNISON Scotland
WDM Scotland
WWF Scotland

See also Stop Climate Chaos (UK) Members.

See also
I Count
Stop Climate Chaos (UK)

References

External links
Stop Climate Chaos Scotland
Stop Climate Chaos (UK)
Boom In Scots Air Travel Set To Bust Emissions Targets
Make The Climate Wreckers Explain Their Actions to Children
Climate Change Threat to Sound of Scots Hillside
Dust to Dust
A Prayer for a Greener Scotland
Climate Fears As Arctic Ice Sheet Thins To Record Low

Climate change organisations based in the United Kingdom
Environmental organisations based in Scotland
Climate of Scotland
Energy in Scotland
Organisations based in Edinburgh
Political advocacy groups in Scotland
Environmental organizations established in 2005
2005 establishments in Scotland